Francis Healy (born 23 July 1973) is a Scottish singer, songwriter and musician. He is the lead singer and lyricist of the band Travis, having written nearly all of the songs on their first six studio albums and their ninth, with the seventh and eighth being more co-written works. He is based in Los Angeles. Healy released his debut solo album, titled Wreckorder, in October 2010.

Early life
Born in Stafford, England, Healy grew up in Glasgow, Scotland, his mother's home town.
His mother had moved back to Scotland after divorcing her husband. Healy has said that both his mother and his grandmother were major influences on him. Healy attended Holyrood Secondary School in Glasgow.

As a young child at primary school, he was awarded a book of Robert Burns poems and a certificate "For Outstanding Singing Abilities" after singing the old Scottish song "Westering Home" while dressed in a kilt. However, Healy showed no further interest in singing until his teens. His obsession with songwriting began to take shape when he got his first guitar in 1986 at the age of 13, having seen Roy Orbison perform his hit "Pretty Woman" on The Last Resort with Jonathan Ross. First songs played on the guitar were old rock'n'roll numbers like "Johnny B. Goode" and "Three Steps to Heaven" by Eddie Cochran. His first complete song was written about the headmaster of his school, Peter Mullen, entitled "Mr. Mullen Blues", with a sample lyric: "...and there was Pete Mullen, with his pie and beans. It was then I smelled it, it filled the room. Then some wee bugger lit a match and the whole place went Ka-BOOM... Where's your tie boy? Pick up that can. Get in line girl, do you understand... Cause his name is big Pete Mullen... And he's a man". Healy performed it at the school talent show but failed to move the judges. He played in several school bands.

Travis

In 1991, Neil Primrose, the drummer of Glasgow band Glass Onion, asked Healy if he would like to audition for the band; their previous singer, Catherine Maxwell, had just left the band. Healy joined the band on the same day he enrolled at the Glasgow School of Art. This band soon changed their name to Travis, named after the main character in the Wim Wenders film Paris, Texas.

Travis' first single, "All I Want to Do Is Rock", was written by Healy while on a visit to Millport on Great Cumbrae, a small island in the Firth of Clyde. Going there with the sole intention of composing the best song he had written, Healy surprised himself when the track was created. In spite of Healy's success as a songwriter since, he is without formal musical training. As the band has risen to prominence, Healy has continued to be Travis' main songwriter, as well as the band's main spokesman and most recognisable member.

Travis has twice been awarded British album of the year at the annual BRIT Awards, and is credited as having paved the way for post-Britpop British bands such as Coldplay and Keane. Travis have released nine studio albums, beginning with Good Feeling in 1997.

Other musical activities
Although Healy predominantly plays guitar, he has also been known to write and perform with piano.

In 2000, he appeared on The Clint Boon Experience single "Do What You Do (Earworm Song)", reaching number 63 in the UK charts. Boon described this song as his "masterpiece".

In 2010 Healy released the solo album Wreckorder, which featured Paul McCartney on bass and Neko Case.

He co-wrote the song "Here With Me" from The Killers' 2012 album Battle Born.

Influences
In interviews, Healy has talked of being influenced by songwriters such as Joni Mitchell, Paul McCartney and Graham Nash (of The Hollies and Crosby, Stills, Nash and Young fame). Healy has since played with both McCartney and Nash.

Activism
Healy is a part of the movement Make Poverty History and has, alongside his band, played at the Live 8 concerts in both London and Edinburgh. He  participated in Band Aid 20's re-recording of "Do They Know It's Christmas?", with Healy and friend Nigel Godrich also playing roles in its organisation.

He has so far made two trips to Sudan with the Save the Children organisation, for which he launched the biggest ever global campaign to help the ten million children who die unnecessarily each year to survive.

Healy has also taken part in and been a speaker at several anti-war demonstrations against the Iraq War.

Personal life
Healy lives in Los Angeles with his wife Nora and son Clay, having moved there from Berlin.

In January 2008, it was announced that Healy would curate a new talent compilation for Paul McCartney's Liverpool Institute for Performing Arts.

In 2010, as a way to thank Paul McCartney for playing on his solo album, Healy and his wife became vegetarian. McCartney is a long-time advocate of vegetarianism.

Healy was a member of the Glasgow athletics club Bellahouston Harriers in his youth, and took part in the Berlin Relay Marathon in 2012.

At the 2005 general election, Healy was reported to be a supporter of the Liberal Democrats. In a 2013 interview, speaking of an earlier interview in which he appeared to criticise Alex Salmond, he said "I certainly came across as pro-Labour but the truth is I'm not pro-anyone."

Equipment 

 1956 Fender Telecaster Sunburst
 1958 Fender Telecaster Butterscotsch
 1964 Fender Telecaster Black
 1970 Fender Telecaster Natural White
 Fender Mustang Candy Apple Red
 Fender Mustang Olympic White
 Fender Thinline Telecaster Mahogany & Sunburst
 Martin 12 String Acoustic
 Martin D-18 Acoustic
 Vox AC30
 Marshall Amplifiers

Discography
 
Studio albums
Wreckorder (2010)

Featured singles

 "Do They Know It's Christmas?" (2004) – as part of Band Aid 20

References

External links
Official Fran Healy site (archived)
Official Travis site
February 2011 – Métronome / An interview with Fran Healy (Spanish)

1973 births
Living people
Scottish people of Irish descent
Scottish male karateka
Anti–Iraq War activists
British anti-poverty advocates
Alumni of the Glasgow School of Art
Scottish expatriates in Germany
Scottish activists
Scottish male guitarists
Scottish pop singers
Scottish rock singers
Scottish male singer-songwriters
Scottish singer-songwriters
People from Stafford
Travis (band) members
Ivor Novello Award winners
Scottish pop pianists
People educated at Holyrood Secondary School
Liberal Democrats (UK) people
People from SoHo, Manhattan
BNQT members
Scottish Roman Catholics